Francisco Javier Acuña Víctor (born 19 January 1988) is a Mexican professional footballer who plays as a midfielder for Liga de Expansión MX club Sonora.

Club career

UANL
Acuña developed with the youth squads of Tigres UANL. In 2008, he made his debut with the reserves in the Primera División A, making eight appearances that season. He later made his Mexican Primera División debut for UANL on 19 October 2008 as a substitute in a 4–1 win over Monterrey, and scored his first professional goal in the 90th minute of the same match. He also made two appearances for UANL in the 2009 InterLiga.

In the 2009–10 season, Acuña made ten league appearances, scoring two goals. The following year, he played his first full season of professional football, making 27 league appearances and scoring four goals. He also appeared in the second leg of UANL's Clausura Liguilla series against Guadalajara.

In the 2011–12 season, Acuña saw a sharp reduction in playing time, making only seven league appearances and two in the Copa Libertadores, as well as one appearance in the Apertura Liguilla against Pachuca. In the first half of the 2012–13 season, he made two league appearances and two appearances in CONCACAF Champions League before being loaned out until the end of the season.

Loan to San Luis
On 6 December 2012, Acuña was loaned to San Luis until the end of the season. He made ten league appearances and three in the Copa Mexico for San Luis that year.

Loan to Morelia
In 2014, he went on loan to Monarcas Morelia, where he made two league appearances and one in the Copa Libertadores that season.

Atlético Ottawa
On 30 March 2020, Acuña signed with Canadian Premier League side Atlético Ottawa. He made his debut in Ottawa's inaugural match on August 15 against York9.

Necaxa
On 5 January 2021, Acuña returned to Mexico, signing with Liga MX side Necaxa.

Personal life
Acuña was nicknamed "El Messi" throughout his career, a nickname he would later say generated unrealistic high expectations.

Career statistics

Honours
Tigres UANL
Mexican Primera División: Apertura 2011

References

External links
 

1988 births
Living people
Association football midfielders
Footballers from Sonora
Sportspeople from Hermosillo
Mexican expatriate footballers
Expatriate soccer players in Canada
Mexican expatriate sportspeople in Canada
Tigres UANL footballers
San Luis F.C. players
Atlante F.C. footballers
Atlético Morelia players
Club Puebla players
Lobos BUAP footballers
Atlético Ottawa players
Club Necaxa footballers
Liga MX players
Ascenso MX players
Canadian Premier League players
Mexican footballers